Jesse Väänänen (born January 6, 1984 in Lahti) is a Finnish cross-country skier who has competed since 2003. He finished 22nd in the individual sprint event at the 2010 Winter Olympics in Vancouver.

Väänänen's best World Cup finish was fourth in a sprint event in Estonia in January 2010.

Cross-country skiing results
All results are sourced from the International Ski Federation (FIS).

Olympic Games

World Cup

Season standings

References

External links

1984 births
Living people
Sportspeople from Lahti
Cross-country skiers at the 2010 Winter Olympics
Finnish male cross-country skiers
Olympic cross-country skiers of Finland
21st-century Finnish people